Tracy Coogan is an Irish actress most widely noted for her leading role in the 2004 independent film Zombie Honeymoon.

Career
Coogan was born and raised in Trim, County Meath, Ireland, one of five children of Michael and Ann Coogan. She first acted in many theatrical productions at school. The summer after she graduated from secondary school, Coogan went to New York City to represent Ireland in a modeling competition. She stayed in New York, where she landed roles in Irish Repertory Theatre stage productions of The Playboy of the Western World, The Colleen Bawn and Poor Beast in the Rain. Her first screen credit was a bit part as a model in the 1998 Woody Allen movie Celebrity. In 2002 Coogan starred in Love without Borders, a Russian television series filmed in Moscow. Coogan's performance as the loving wife of a zombie in the 2004 horror cult hit Zombie Honeymoon, which won her a Fangoria Chainsaw award in 2006 for best low-budget film, has been praised. The film was acquired by Showtime for release on both DVD and television. Coogan has been noted as "a passionate, sensitive and hard-working actor, with a strong professional work ethic." She stars also for the Charity event Bowling for Boobies on 27 October 2009 in Los Angeles alongside Carlee Baker, Heather Snell, Brooke Lewis and Eve Mauro, the event fights against Breast cancer.

Filmography

Stage
 Hamlet - Gertrude (The Tower Theatre )
 Macbeth - Lady Macbeth (Director Gavin McAlinden )
 La Rose Rouge - One Act (Director George Eugeniou)
 A Flea in her Ear - Raymonde Chandebise- (Director Gavin McAlinden)
 Trash - Girl (EST Los Angeles)
 The Colleen Bawn - Eily O'Connor (Irish Repertory Theatre)
 Scattergood - Miss Regan (MCC Theatre)
 Poor Beast in the Rain - Eileen (Irish Art Center)
 Playboy of the Western World - Sara Tansay (Irish Repertory Theatre)
 Tell Dorie not to Cry - Dorie (Stetson Studio)
 Barefoot in the Park - Corie (Stetson Studio)

References

External links
 Tracy Coogan's website
 
 Tracy Coogan's interview with Raymond Dowaliby in Scars Magazine
  Tracy Coogan's interview with Dai Green on  HorrorNews.net

Year of birth missing (living people)
Living people
Irish film actresses
Irish stage actresses
Actors from County Meath